Steinborn may refer to:

 Steinborn, German surname
 Steinborn, Bitburg-Prüm, Rhineland-Palatinate, Germany